The Russell Kirk Center for Cultural Renewal is a nonprofit educational organization based in Mecosta, Michigan. It was founded in order to continue the legacy of Dr. Russell Kirk, an American political theorist, historian, social critic, literary critic, and fiction author. The Center is known for promoting traditionalist conservatism and regularly publishing Studies in Burke and His Time and The University Bookman, the oldest conservative book review in the United States.

The University Bookman
The University Bookman was founded by Russell Kirk in 1960 as A Quarterly Review of Educational Materials. It is the oldest continuously published right-leaning book journal in the United States. From 1960 to 1990, the journal was distributed freely to subscribers of National Review. For most of its history, the journal had been edited by members of the Kirk family, until 2005, when Gerald Russello was appointed editor.

Some of its notable contributors include James Schall, Peter Augustine Lawler, Allan Carlson, John Lukacs, and George Nash.

Staff
The Russell Kirk Center's president is Annette Y. Kirk, widow of Russell Kirk; Jeffrey O. Nelson, Kirk's son-in-law, is director of publications. Senior Fellows at the Center include Ian Crowe, Bruce Frohnen, Vigen Guroian, George H. Nash, Marco Respinti, Jeffrey Polet, and Gleaves Whitney. The Center's Board of Advisors includes T. Kenneth Cribb, Jr., John Engler, Edwin J. Feulner, John Lukacs, Forrest McDonald, and George H. Nash.

See also
Manhattan Institute for Policy Research
National Association of Scholars

References

External links
Russell Kirk Center for Cultural Renewal
Edmund Burke Society of America
The University Bookman
Russell Kirk, Man of Letters blog
"Writings of Kirk and Buckley", broadcast from the Russell Kirk Center from C-SPAN's American Writers

Political organizations based in the United States
Education in Mecosta County, Michigan
Tourist attractions in Mecosta County, Michigan
Conservative organizations in the United States